The 1994 Barnet Council election took place on 5 May 1994 to elect members of Barnet London Borough Council in London, England. The whole council was up for election and the council went in no overall control.

Following the elections, a Labour-Liberal Democrat coalition was formed, replacing the previous Conservative majority.

Background

Election result
Overall turnout in the election was 45.4%.

|}

Ward results

Arkley

Brunswick Park

Burnt Oak

Childs Hill

Colindale

East Barnet

East Finchley

Edgware

Finchley

Friern Barnet

Garden Suburb

Golders Green

Hadley

Hale

Hendon

Mill Hill

St Paul’s

Totteridge

West Hendon

Woodhouse

By-elections between 1994 and 1998

Colindale

The by-election was called following the death of Cllr. Ellis S. Hillman.

Colindale

The by-election was called following the death of Cllr. Thomas A. McKendry.

Edgware

The by-election was called following the resignation of Cllr. Julian D. Czarny.

Hendon

The by-election was called following the resignation of Cllr. Edward P. Bunn.

References

1994
1994 London Borough council elections